Javier F. Peña (born 1958) is an American former Drug Enforcement Administration agent who investigated Pablo Escobar and the Medellín Cartel. Peña worked as a consultant on the Netflix series Narcos.

Biography 
Peña was raised in Hebbronville, Texas, and graduated from Hebbronville High School. He attended Texas A&I University where he studied sociology and psychology. Peña served as a deputy sheriff for Webb County sheriff’s office in Laredo from 1976 to 1984, and then continued his service with the DEA until his retirement. He was involved in the 1985 capture of Mexican drug lord Rafael Caro Quintero.

Following the investigation of the Medellín Cartel, Peña worked for the DEA with additional assignments in Puerto Rico, Texas and Colombia. Peña was promoted to special agent in charge of the San Francisco office in 2004, the Caribbean office in 2008, and finally the Houston office in 2011, before retiring in 2014.

In 2019, he published Manhunters: How We Took Down Pablo Escobar with Stephen Murphy.

In popular culture 
Peña is one of the main characters in the three seasons of Netflix TV series Narcos, in which his character is portrayed by Pedro Pascal. Peña himself worked as a consultant on the show. He makes a cameo appearance in the last episode of Season 2, "Al Fin Cayó!", alongside Murphy.

References 

1958 births
Date of birth uncertain
Drug Enforcement Administration agents
Living people
People from Kingsville, Texas
Texas A&I University alumni